Arrans is a commune in the Côte-d'Or department in the Bourgogne-Franche-Comté region of eastern France.

Geography
Arrans is located some 6 km north of Montbard and 5 km south-east of Asnières-en-Montagne. Access to the commune is by the D5 road from Montbard in the south which passes through the heart of the commune and the village and continues north to Verdonnet. The D119 road also links the village to Asnières-en-Montagne in the north-west. The D5E branches off the D5 in the commune and goes south-west to Saint-Rémy. The commune is mostly forest with farmland around and east of the village.

Neighbouring communes and villages

Administration

List of Successive Mayors

Demography
In 2017 the commune had 73 inhabitants.

Religious heritage

The Parish Church of Saint-Pierre-Célestin contains 2 Monumental Paintings of Saint Ambroise and Saint Nicolas (16th century) that are registered as an historical object.

See also
Communes of the Côte-d'Or department

References

External links
Arrans on the National Geographic Institute website 
Arrans on Géoportail, National Geographic Institute (IGN) website 
Gd. Aran on the 1750 Cassini Map

Communes of Côte-d'Or